Longobucco is a town and comune in the province of Cosenza, in the Calabria region of southern Italy. Longobucco is one of the main municipalities of the Sila National Park and in terms of its territory is one of the largest in Calabria. It is a small town in the heart of Sila Greca, part of the Greater Sila Plateau, in the midst of mountains, rivers and lakes that are home to numerous species of animals and plants.

History
Longobucco's name derives from the Latina longa bucca ("large mouth"), referring to the original Greek name of the nearby torrent Macrocioli; in the past it was associated with Temesa, or Tempsa, the ancient town Homer was referring to in his Odyssey and famous for its mining fields, from which the Sybarites  derived silver to coin their  coins, as well as Kroton and the Romans. The first documents about the Argentera date to the 12th century. In 1197 Emperor Henry VI sent to oppido nostro Longoburgi (our town Longburg) his relative Pietro di Livonia  to supervise the precious mineral extraction. Even Gioacchino da Fiore went there for the manufacturing of some goblets.

In the 16th century ‘the Argentera‘ was the most important mine in the area, where people continued working until 1783. Between 1806 and 1808 Longobucco was thrice invaded by the French. From 1861 on, the town was involved in the phenomenon of Brigantaggio, which was hardly repressed. It turned into the land of famous bandit-chiefs, among whom was Domenico Strafaci known as Palma. Emigration to the United States and Argentina reached its peak at this time as Longobucchesi such as the Gammuto family sought to escape poverty and the brigantaggio to find opportunity in the new world. Longobucco was the birthplace of famous American gangsters such as Frankie Yale.

At the beginning of the 19th century, the first power stations started working.  After World War II the Longobucchesi took part in a massive working-class and farm-labourers rebellion. In the 1950s a reforestation process was started by reclaiming areas, as well as in the 1960s and the 1970s many services too. Today's projects are relying on tourism, natural resources, typical products, craftsmanship and cooperation for the development of the town.

Economy
Longobucco has always been known for its artisanal handicraft, especially weaving. The outstanding products of Longobucco’s textile art are its blankets.

Twin towns
 Signa, Italy
 Luzzi, Italy

External links
Museum of Craftmanship in Longobucco

Cities and towns in Calabria